Haftad Mish (also Romanized as Haftād Mīsh; also known as Sāgūrch-e Haftād Mīsh and Sāgūrch Haftādmīsh) is a village in Derakhtengan Rural District, in the Central District of Kerman County, Kerman Province, Iran. At the 2006 census, its population was 22, in 7 families.

References 

Populated places in Kerman County